Aladakatti is a village in Dharwad district of Karnataka, India.

Demographics
As of the 2011 Census of India there were 229 households in Aladakatti and a total population of 1,062 consisting of 550 males and 512 females. There were 131 children ages 0-6.

References

Villages in Dharwad district